Kalskag, Alaska may refer to:

Lower Kalskag, Alaska
Upper Kalskag, Alaska
Kalskag Airport, serving both communities